Justin Tanner Petersen (28 July 1960 Washington, D.C. – 13 March 2010 Los Angeles, California) was an American hacker, concert promoter, sound engineer, private investigator and an informant for the Federal Bureau of Investigation. While tasked with helping to catch other hackers and fugitives wanted by the FBI, he continued to commit serious crimes.

Life
Justin Petersen, born on July 28, 1960 in Washington D.C., started hacking computers in 1978. In 1984, he moved to Los Angeles. It was there he found an affinity for Los Angeles night life, with the Sunset Strip being a major focal point. In 1989, Petersen, using the handle Agent Steal and the alias Eric Heinz that he had been living under since his departure from the East, cracked the computers of the Pacific Bell Telephone Company in California and used his access to intercept the telephone lines of several local FM radio stations.  With this access, he and a couple of associates were able to ensure that they were the only callers who could get through during on-air contests, and thus the only winners. Although the associates remain officially unknown, strong rumors persist that Kevin Poulsen (aka Dark Dante), and Ronald Austin were involved. Their winnings included $50,000 in cash, several trips to Hawaii and two Porsches.  Realizing he was being pursued by the FBI, Petersen moved to Texas, where he then hacked into a national credit reporting agency, ordered fraudulent credit cards using the information he found, and used them freely.

After receiving a tip, Petersen was arrested in Texas in 1991. In an FBI affidavit, Petersen admitted to physically and electronically conducting illegal telephone taps and breaking into Pacific Bell's COSMOS and other companies' computer systems to check telephone numbers and determine the location of telephone lines and circuits. A grand jury in Texas returned an eight-count indictment, accusing Petersen of assuming false identities, accessing a computer without authorization, possessing stolen account IDs and fraudulently obtaining and using credit cards. Petersen also faced several other charges pertaining to national security: one charge regarded his supposed compilation and documentation of U.S. Federal Government wire taps of persons currently under surveillance.  Under a plea bargain the charge was dropped after a debriefing by unknown law enforcement entities (presumably the FBI or US Secret Service), according to Littman.

The case was ultimately transferred to California. Petersen eventually pleaded guilty to six counts, including the aforementioned rigging of a radio station contest to win a $20,000 prize. He faced a sentence of up to 40 years in prison and a $1.5 million fine, but sentencing was delayed several times as Petersen became an informant for the FBI for almost two years.  He had said that the FBI paid him monthly, plus free rent, computers and other unspecified resources "to help them set up hackers," including Kevin Mitnick (aka Condor), and Kevin Poulsen (aka Dark Dante), and others.

On 18 October 1993, 15 months after entering his first guilty plea, Petersen was confronted inside a federal courthouse by David J. Schindler, Assistant US Attorney for the prosecution (who is now a private attorney for the Church of Scientology,) who asked if he had committed any crimes while free on bail. Petersen asked to have a conference with his attorney, according to Schindler. Petersen met briefly with his attorney, then escaped from the federal courthouse becoming a fugitive once again. Attorney Richard Sherman, who represented a friend of Kevin Mitnick's in another computer crime case, accused the FBI of not only using Petersen as an informant, but also of turning a blind eye to alleged computer and credit-card crimes Petersen committed during his time cooperating.

Petersen also claims the FBI refused to allow him to work with or on computers afterward.  Given his physical limitations resulting from an accident in 1985, and legal restrictions imposed by the FBI, Petersen claimed he had little choice but to briefly turn back to hacking since he was unable to get a job.

While still a fugitive, Petersen allegedly hacked into the computers of Heller Financial, a commercial lending company.  An unnamed associate phoned in two bomb threats to the bank.  While the building was being evacuated, Petersen allegedly initiated a wire transfer of $150,000 from Heller Financial to Union Bank, by way of Mellon Bank.  The transfer was discovered before his associate could withdraw the money.

In November 1995, Peterson was sentenced to 41 months (3.4 years) in U.S. federal prison and three years of probation, and payment of restitution of $40,000. It is rumored that Petersen worked for the Central Intelligence Agency in Amsterdam, although details are unclear.

Scientology

Author Jonathan Littman in his book, linked Petersen's sealed Texas court case  with the Church of Scientology via a private investigator (in Beverly Hills, California) named Shlomi Michaels and former FBI Special Agent in Charge Ted Gunderson. The firm he worked for contracted him to eavesdrop on the Aznarans, who were high-ranking ex-Scientologists living in the state of Texas. The Aznarans were at the time cooperating with Richard Behar in the writing of the highly critical 1991 Time magazine cover story.  Vicki and Richard Aznaran left the church under circumstances that they describe as involving duress. They filed a complaint against Scientology alleging false imprisonment, intentional infliction of emotional distress and other tortious conduct.

Death
Petersen was found dead in his Los Angeles apartment on March 12, 2010.

List of books referencing Petersen

References

External links
Justin Petersen on Myspace

American computer criminals
Hackers
Federal Bureau of Investigation informants
2010 deaths
1960 births